The 2013 Southern Conference baseball tournament was held from May 22 through 26 at Fluor Field at the West End in Greenville, South Carolina.  The annual event determines the conference champion of the Division I Southern Conference in college baseball.  Third seeded  won their second tournament champion to earn the league's bid to the 2013 NCAA Division I baseball tournament.  This was the last of 18 athletic championships held by the conference in the 2012–13 academic year.

The tournament was originally held from 1950-53, when the Southern Conference was a large conference composed of several small schools and several large schools, the latter of which would form the Atlantic Coast Conference after the 1953 season.  The event was re-established in 1984 and has been held every year since.  Western Carolina has claimed nine championships, the most of any school, with The Citadel close behind at eight tournament wins.  Georgia Southern and Furman are the only other schools with multiple championships, winning five and two, respectively.  Davidson and UNC Greensboro are the only current members to never win a title.

This is the second consecutive year and third year overall for the tournament in Greenville, after spending 21 of 22 seasons in Charleston, South Carolina.

Seeding and format
The top eight teams from the regular season are seeded one through eight based on conference winning percentage.  They meet in a two bracket double-elimination tournament with a championship game between the winners of each bracket.  Davidson, UNC Greensboro, and Wofford did not qualify for the field.  College of Charleston claimed the second seed over Elon by tiebreaker.

Bracket

All-Tournament Team
The following players were named to the All-Tournament team.

Most Outstanding Player
Joe Jackson was named Tournament Most Outstanding Player.  Jackson was a catcher for The Citadel who recorded 10 hits in 13 at-bats and reached base on 18 of 20 plate appearances for the tournament.

References

Southern Conference Baseball Tournament
Southern Conference baseball tournament
Tournament
Baseball competitions in Greenville, South Carolina
College baseball tournaments in South Carolina
Southern Conference baseball tournament